Franz von Reber (10 November 1834 in Cham, Bavaria – 4 September 1919 in Pöcking) was a German art historian.

After studying in Munich and Berlin, he went to Rome, and in 1858 established himself as lecturer at the University of Munich, was appointed professor at the Polytechnicum of Munich in 1863 and director of the Royal Gallery in 1875.

Writings
 Die Ruinen Roms und der Campagna (2d ed. 1879).
 Geschichte der Baukunst im Altertums (History of ancient architecture, 1864–67).
 Kunstgeschichte des Altertums, 1871 ("History of Ancient Art"; Eng. trans. and supplement by Clarke, New York, 1882).
 Geschichte der neueren deutschen Kunst (History of recent German art, 2d ed. 1884)
 Kunstgeschichte des Mittelalters, 1886 ("History of mediaeval art", Eng. trans. 1887).
 Geschichte der Malerei vom Anfang des 14. bis zum Ende des 18. Jahrhunderts (History of painting from the beginning of the 14th until the end of the 18th century, 1894).
 Die phrygischen Felsendenkmäler (Phrygian cliff memorials, 1897).
 Vitruvius, Des Vitruvius zehn Bücher über Architektur, as translator (1865).
 Catalogue of the paintings in the Old Pinakothek Munich with a historical introduction by Franz von Reber; translated by Joseph Thacher Clarke (1885). 
 Max Rooses, Geschiedenis der Antwerpsche schilderschool (History of the Antwerp School of Painting) translated as: Geschichte der Malerschule Antwerpens von Q. Massijs bis zu den letzten Ausläufern der Schule P.P. Rubens (2nd edition, 1889).

References

External links
 
 

1834 births
1919 deaths
German art historians
Academic staff of the Technical University of Munich
People from Cham, Germany
German male non-fiction writers